The spot (Leiostomus xanthurus), also known commonly as the Norfolk spot and the Virginia spot, is a species of small short-lived saltwater fish in the family Sciaenidae. The species inhabits estuary and coastal waters from Massachusetts to Texas, and derives its name from the prominent dark spot behind each gill. It is the only species in the genus Leiostomus. Spot are frequently caught by recreational anglers and are good to eat.

Their diet consists largely of organic detritus, small crustaceans, and worms. Bloodworms are the ideal bait when fishing for spot.

Spot are the natural prey of the following fish: striped bass, blue fish, flounder, sandbar shark, dogfish shark, weakfish, red drum, black drum, spotted seatrout, Atlantic mackerel, king mackerel, spanish mackerel, barracuda, cobia, black sea bass, and tarpon. The list can go on for some time however these are some of the most known predators of the spot fish.

Fishermen also use juvenile spot as whole live bait to catch summer flounder, spotted seatrout, and red drum as well as several other species.

The North Carolina Spot Festival is held at Hampstead, North Carolina, on the last weekend of September.

Distribution 
L. xanthurus is native to the west central and northwest regions on the Atlantic Ocean. It is found along the Gulf of Mexico, along the southern coast of the U.S from Massachusetts and down to Campeche, Mexico. It is typically found in depths no more than 6 meters, but can be found up to 50 meters in depth. Irregularly, it can also be found in south Florida, the Florida Keys, and near Cape Cod.

Habitat 
L. xanthurus lives in salt waters, especially brackish waters, mostly over sandy and muddy floors. It lives in the estuaries and bays until spring, when it migrates to the deeper waters that it spawns in. During summer, it moves to water with a higher salinity, and then it moves offshore once autumn begins, and the water begins to cool.

Diet 
L. xanthurus is omnivorous, and eats benthic invertebrates, small crustaceans, and plant and animal detritus. This includes polychaetes, worms, small fish, small plankton, and mollusks.

Importance for Humans 
L. xanthurus is a very important fish for both recreational and commercial fishing. It was ranked third in a recreational fishing survey done in 1980, and is still one of the most frequently caught fish.

Reproduction and Lifestyle 
L. xanthurus spawns in fall to early winter time. It moves from its typical bay and estuary habitat to an offshore area of deeper water, where up to 1.7 million eggs may be laid. The eggs are externally fertilized and pushed back toward shore. Larvae quickly grow in the warmer offshore water and move into coastal shallows and bays for winter.

Management
Spot are protected and monitored under the Chesapeake Bay Atlantic Croaker and Spot Fishery Management Plan of 1991. The 1987 fishery management plan of the Atlantic States Marine Fisheries Commission was aimed mainly at reducing the numbers of juvenile fish taken as bycatch by shrimpers.

At least one aquaculture project in New Jersey is attempting to culture spot for potential commercial production.

References

 Chao, L. & Espinosa-Perez, H. 2015. Leiostomus xanthurus. The IUCN Red List of Threatened Species 2015: e.T193267A49239289. http://dx.doi.org/10.2305/IUCN.UK.2015-2.RLTS.T193267A49239289.en.
  Bare, L. 2001. "Leiostomus xanthurus" (On-line), Animal Diversity Web. Accessed May 2, 2017 at http://animaldiversity.org/accounts/Leiostomus_xanthurus/
 Hill, K. 2005. Leiostomus xanthurus. Smithsonian Marine Station. Retrieved May 2, 2017 at http://www.sms.si.edu/irlspec/leiosto_xanthu.htm

External links

Sciaenidae
Sport fish
Fish described in 1802